Euconulus praticola is a species of small air-breathing land snail, a terrestrial pulmonate gastropod mollusk in the family Euconulidae, the hive snails.

Distribution 
This species occurs in the Czech Republic

References

Euconulidae
Gastropods described in 1883